The 30th Europe/Africa Zone is one of three zones of regional competition in the 2022 Billie Jean King Cup.

Group I 
 Venue: Megasaray Tennis Academy, Antalya, Turkey (clay)
 Date: 11–16 April 2022

The eleven teams were divided into two pools of five and six teams. The nations finishing first in their pools were automatically advanced to the 2022 Billie Jean King Cup play-offs. The nations finishing 2nd in their pools took part in a play-off to determine the nation advancing to the 2022 Billie Jean King Cup play-offs. The nations finishing last and second-last in their pools took part in a relegation play-offs, with the losing nations relegated to Group II for 2023.

Seeding

 1Billie Jean King Cup Rankings as of 8 November 2021

Pools

Play-offs

Final placements 

  was added based on ranking (38th) when  was chosen as host and automatic qualifier of the 2022 Billie Jean King Cup Finals.

Group II 
 Venue: Vierumäki, Finland (indoor hard)
 Date: 12–15 April 2022

The seven teams were divided into two pools of three and four teams. The four nations finishing 1st and 2nd in their pools took part in play-offs to determine the nations advancing to Group I in 2023. The nations finishing third took part in a relegation play-off, with the losing nations relegated to Group III for 2023, along with the nation finishing last in Group B.

Seeding

 1Billie Jean King Cup Rankings as of 8 November 2021

Pools

Play-offs

Final placements 

Group III 
 Venue 1: Bellevue Tennis Club, Ulcinj, Montenegro (clay) 
 Venue 2: Tennis Club Jug, Skopje, North Macedonia (clay)

 Dates: 7–11 June 2022 (Ulcinj) / 5–10 July 2022 (Skopje)

The twenty-eight nations were split into two events. Event A was held in Ulcinj, whilst Event B was held in Skopje. In Ulcinj, the eleven teams were split into two pools of four nations and one pool of three nations. The top teams in each group will contest a two stage knock-out draw, with one team earning promotion to Europe/Africa Zone Group II in 2023. In Skopje, the seventeen teams were split into two pools of four nations and three pools of three nations. An eight-team knock-out draw made up of the top team from each group and the two best 2nd place teams will determine the one nation promoted to Europe/Africa Zone Group II in 2023.

Seeding

Ulcinj

 1Billie Jean King Cup Rankings as of 19 April 2022

Skopje

 1Billie Jean King Cup Rankings as of 19 April 2022

Pools

Event A (Ulcinj)

Event B (Skopje)

Play-offs

Promotional play-offs

4th–6th (Ulcinj) and 5th–8th (Skopje) place play-offs

7th–9th (Ulcinj) and 9th–12th (Skopje) place play-offs

10th-place play-off (Ulcinj)

13th-place play-off (Skopje)

Final placements 

References 

 Billie Jean King Cup Result, 2022 Europe/Africa Group I
 Billie Jean King Cup Result, 2022 Europe/Africa Group II
 Billie Jean King Cup Result, 2022 Europe/Africa Group III

Notes

External links 
 Billie Jean King Cup website

Europe/Africa
 
Tennis tournaments in Finland
Tennis tournaments in Turkey
Tennis tournaments in Montenegro
Tennis in North Macedonia
Billie Jean King Cup Europe/Africa Zone
Billie Jean King Cup Europe/Africa Zone
Billie Jean King Cup Europe/Africa Zone
Billie Jean King Cup Europe/Africa Zone